Abinye David Jumbo born (February 11 1988), known by his stage name Mr 2Kay, is a Nigerian singer and songwriter. He was formally signed Grafton Entertainment, but left the label in 2018 to start his own imprint Better Life Entertainment.

Early life

Mr 2Kay was born in Port Harcourt. After his birth, his family moved to Bonny Island, Rivers State where he grew up. 2Kay was also a good artist as he drew portraits growing up.

Career 
Mr 2Kay started his music career in Port Harcourt and his break out single from Port Harcourt was "Waterside Boy", released 21 August 2011 under Grafton Entertainment,  but he didn't gain international attention until 2012 when he released "Bubugaga" which was his international break out single. "Bubugaga" was released on 8 October 2012. The music video for "Bubugaga" was shot in London, UK and directed by Nosa Igbinedion under Grafton Entertainment.

Personal life

Robbery
On 25 October 2017, Mr 2Kay was reportedly robbed by four armed men in his hotel room at Eko Hotels and Suites at Victoria Island, Lagos after performing at 2Baba's Buckwyld and Breathless Concert, which took place at the convention centre of Eko Hotel. 2Kay was left with injuries sustain from the robbery. The robbers totally bound his arms, legs and mouth while they left with his valuables which included clothes, jewelry, phones, perfumes, and money. One week after robbery Mr 2Kay released a new single "Pray for Me" which was scheduled for a late November release along with his forthcoming album which is currently on hold due to the incident. His label, Grafton Records, had to push back the album release date. On 7 November 2017, Mr 2Kay reportedly filed a $500 million lawsuit against the management of Eko Hotels and Suites where the incident happened in October.

Notable performances
He has performed in several popular events and shows since his rise to stardom, performed in events like:
Factory78 TV – Mr 2Kay Performs Bubugaga Live / Face-off interview in 2012
Afrobeats London Party at Coronet in 2014.
 Carniriv Closing Ceremony In 2014.
Prestigious London Jazz cafe IN 2014.
All Africa Music Awards (AFRIMA) At Industry Nite in 2015.

Concert tour
On Sunday, 17 June 2018, at Aztech Arcum Stadium Road Port Harcourt, Rivers State Nigeria. Mr 2Kay kickoff with his album concert "Elevated" features guest artist, radio host/hype man &  disc jockeys Timaya, Duncan Mighty, Harrysong, Charles Okocha, DJ Jimmy Jatt, DJ Neptune, DJ Big N, DJ Kev, Joenell, Ayi, Real Prince, Idahams, Doray, Young GreyC, Squeeze Tarela, Legendary Sunny, Ajebo Hustlers, King Perryy, M Trill, Korkormikor, Olisa Adibua, Shope Shopsy and Alex from Big Brother Naija (season 3). The concert was recorded sold out with a capacity of over two thousand seats. Tickets were sold from two to five hundred thousand Nigerian naira.

Mr 2Kay posted on his social media pages on 2 April 2018, to announce a singing/dancing competition where he'll be giving away $2000 (Two Thousand Dollars) to 2 persons in Port Harcourt.

Discography

Awards and nominations

See also
Music of Port Harcourt
List of Nigerian musicians

References

Living people
Singers from Port Harcourt
Nigerian male pop singers
21st-century Nigerian male singers
Songwriters from Rivers State
1988 births